Luciano Panetti (13 July 1929 – 26 December 2016) was an Italian professional footballer who played as a goalkeeper.

Career
Throughout his career, Panetti played for 7 seasons (168 games) in the Italian Serie A for A.S. Roma and Torino F.C.

Honours
Roma
 Inter-Cities Fairs Cup winner: 1960–61.

References

1929 births
2016 deaths
Italian footballers
Serie A players
Modena F.C. players
A.S. Roma players
Torino F.C. players
Association football goalkeepers